Izaka Aboudou (born 14 March 1994) is a Ghanaian footballer who plays for Kuwaiti club Al-Jahra as a forward.

Career
On 12 July 2022, Aboudou joined Kuwaiti club Al-Jahra.

References

External links
 

1994 births
Living people
Ghanaian footballers
Ghanaian expatriate footballers
Rail Club du Kadiogo players
CS Hammam-Lif players
Stade Gabèsien players
Al-Fahaheel FC players
Nejmeh SC players
ES Métlaoui players
Al-Kawkab FC players
Najran SC players
Al Jahra SC players
Association football forwards
Burkinabé Premier League players
Tunisian Ligue Professionnelle 1 players
Kuwait Premier League players
Lebanese Premier League players
Saudi First Division League players
Expatriate footballers in Burkina Faso
Expatriate footballers in Tunisia
Expatriate footballers in Kuwait
Expatriate footballers in Lebanon
Expatriate footballers in Saudi Arabia
Ghanaian expatriate sportspeople in Burkina Faso
Ghanaian expatriate sportspeople in Tunisia
Ghanaian expatriate sportspeople in Kuwait
Ghanaian expatriate sportspeople in Lebanon
Ghanaian expatriate sportspeople in Saudi Arabia